Curtis "Crawfish" Crider (October 7, 1930 – December 21, 2012) was an American stock car racing driver, and a pioneer in the early years of NASCAR.

Career
Born in Danville, Virginia,  he was one of the hardest working and underfinanced racers to ever drive the stock car circuit. Landing in a lake eventually earned him the nickname "Crawfish". Like most early NASCAR racers, Crider was a bootlegger and delivered moonshine to his customers. From 1959 to 1965, this driver has competed in 232 races in his seven-year career and accumulated a grand total of $58740 ($ when adjusted for inflation). Crider's average start was in 19th place while his average finish was in 15th place.

Following his retirement from NASCAR competition, Crider competed in late model stock car racing in Florida, competing primarily at Volusia County Speedway and winning the Florida State Championship in 1972, 1973 and 1974. He released a book in 1987, called "The Road to Daytona". He operated an automobile restoration shop near his home in Ormond Beach, Florida before he died on December 21, 2012.

References

External links
 

1930 births
2012 deaths
People from Danville, Virginia
Racing drivers from Virginia
NASCAR drivers
People from Ormond Beach, Florida